John Barnes (October 12, 1929 – August 25, 2004) was an American middle-distance runner. He competed in the men's 800 metres at the 1952 Summer Olympics.

References

External links
 

1929 births
2004 deaths
Athletes (track and field) at the 1952 Summer Olympics
American male middle-distance runners
Olympic track and field athletes of the United States
Place of birth missing